Maggie Lee may refer to:
 Maggie Lee (skipjack), a Chesapeake Bay skipjack
 Maggie Lee (Maya & Miguel), a character from the animated children's television series Maya & Miguel

See also
 Margaret Lee (disambiguation)